The 1992 Colonial Athletic Association baseball tournament was held at Harrington Field on the campus of East Carolina in Greenville, North Carolina, from May 12 through 16.  The event determined the champion of the Colonial Athletic Association for the 1992 season.  Top-seeded  won the tournament for the second time and earned the CAA's automatic bid to the 1992 NCAA Division I baseball tournament.

Entering the event, East Carolina had won the most championships, with four, including the previous three.  George Mason and Richmond had each won once.

Format and seeding
The CAA's six teams were seeded one to seven based on winning percentage from the conference's round robin regular season.  They played a double-elimination tournament with the top seed receiving a single bye.  The new format was adopted due to the addition of Old Dominion to the conference.

Bracket and results

Most Valuable Player
Chris Widger was named Tournament Most Valuable Player.  Widger was a catcher for George Mason.

References

Tournament
Colonial Athletic Association Baseball Tournament
Colonial Athletic Association baseball tournament
Colonial Athletic Association baseball tournament
Baseball in North Carolina
College sports in North Carolina
Greenville, North Carolina
Sports competitions in North Carolina
Tourist attractions in Pitt County, North Carolina